Belur Ravi Sharath (born 28 September 1996) is a cricketer in the Karnataka cricket team. He is a Wicket-keeper Batsman. He scored a century on debut against 2017–18 champions of Ranji Trophy (Vidarbha cricket team) on 14 November 2018 at the Vidarbha Cricket Association Stadium. He was part of the Karnataka cricket team squad through the Ranji Trophy season of 2018–19 as the squad reached semi finals. 

Sharath made his Twenty20 debut for Karnataka on 44 January 2018 against Jharkhand at Kolkata. He made his List A cricket debut for Karnataka on 13 February 2018 against Odisha at the Alur. In the Karnataka Premier League he has played for Namma Shivamogga team. He also represented South Zone cricket team in the under 19s in the 2015–16 season.

In November 2019, he was named as the captain of India's squad for the 2019 ACC Emerging Teams Asia Cup in Bangladesh.

References

External links
 

1996 births
Living people
Karnataka cricketers